Toussaint Loua (1824 – 1907) was a French statistician and was credited for inventing the heat map in information visualization.

Career 
Loua was born in Saarn in modern day Germany.

He began his career as a clerk at the Ministry of Commerce in 1850 at the age of 26. From 1875 to 1887, Loua directed the General Directorate of Statistics of France (French: Statistique générale de la France). Under his direction, the SGF published in 1878 the first Statistical Yearbook of France (French: Annuaire statistique de la France) and it was also under its mandate that in 1885 the High Council of Statistics was created.

Bibliography 

 1865 : De la mortalité à Paris dans ses rapports, Berger-Levrault (Paris)
 1865 : Mémoire sur quelques questions de statistique
 1867 : « De l'influence des disettes sur les mouvements de la population », Journal de la société de statistique de Paris, vol. 8, pages 94-97, url
 1873 : Atlas statistique de la population de Paris, J. Dejey (Paris), Version digitale
 1877 : « Les faillites en France depuis 1840 », Journal de la société de statistique de Paris, vol. 18, pages 281-291.
 1877 : « Le Divorce en Belgique », Journal de la société de statistique de Paris, vol. 18, pages 155-158, url
 1879 : Les Logements insalubres à Paris, Berger-Levrault (Paris)
 1885 : Les Déplacements de la population en France, Berger-Levrault (Paris)
 
 1888 : La France sociale et économique d'après les documents officiels les plus récents, Paris : Berger-Levrault
 1889 : « À propos de l'exposition universelle de 1889 », Journal de la société de statistique de Paris, vol. 30, pages 325-330, url

References 

French statisticians
1824 births
1907 deaths
Information visualization experts